Schlesinger v. Councilman, 420 U.S. 738 (1975), was a case decided by the Supreme Court of the United States.

The case was a key part of government arguments in the 2006 case of Hamdan v. Rumsfeld, defending its contention that the Supreme Court should not have heard the case, because Hamdan was still being processed by a military tribunal court in Guantanamo Bay.

Both the majority opinion by Justice John Paul Stevens and the dissenting argument of Justice Antonin Scalia referenced the case.

See also
 List of United States Supreme Court cases, volume 420

External links
 

United States Supreme Court cases
United States Supreme Court cases of the Burger Court
United States military case law
1975 in United States case law